Lampugnano is an underground station on Line 1 of the Milan Metro in Milan, Italy. The station was opened on 12 April 1980 as part of the extension from Lotto to San Leonardo. It is located on Via Giulio Natta, in the Lampugnano district, from which it takes its name. It is located near the Palasharp and the main terminal for intercity bus service.

The station has a car park with 1830 parking spaces.

References

Line 1 (Milan Metro) stations
Railway stations opened in 1980
1980 establishments in Italy
Railway stations in Italy opened in the 20th century